
Buck "Backhand" Adams (born Charles Stephen Allen; November 15, 1955 – October 28, 2008) was an American pornographic film actor and director.

Career
Adams was a boxer and bouncer before entering the pornographic film industry in the early 1980s, shortly after his sister Amber Lynn began her adult film career. He made his directorial debut with the 1988 movie Squirt. He performed in over 700 movies and directed about 80.

Death
Adams died on October 28, 2008, due to complications from heart failure. He died at Northridge Hospital Medical Center, Los Angeles, with his daughter Christa, his sister Amber Lynn, and his close friend Harold Jenkins at his side. Adams had survived several heart attacks during the 1990s. Just before his death he built a studio where he intended to produce Internet videos.

Awards
1987 AVN Award – Best Actor (Video) – Rockey X
1990 XRCO Award – Best Sex Scene – The Chameleon (with Tori Welles)
1992 AVN Award – Best Actor (Film) – Roxy
1995 AVN Award – Best Actor (Film) – No Motive
1995 XRCO Hall of Fame inductee
AVN Hall of Fame inductee

References

External links

 
 
 

1955 births
2008 deaths
American male boxers
American male pornographic film actors
American pornographic film directors
Pornographic film actors from California
20th-century American male actors
American parodists
Parody film directors